The Bridge of Tears is a stone bridge located near the towns of Dunfanaghy and Falcarragh, County Donegal.

History 
Prior to the introduction of railways and modern roads, the bridge was used on the main route to Derry. The port at Derry was used by emigrants leaving to start a new life in countries such as Australia, Canada, England, Scotland and the United States. The bridge was the spot that the emigrants families would say goodbye. Due to the cost of travel, and the unlikeliness that the emigrants would return, their leaving was treated like a funeral.

A small plaque is located near the bridge, with an Irish language passage that translates to "Family and friends of the person leaving for foreign lands would come this far. Here was the separation. This is the Bridge of Tears".

References 

Bridges in the Republic of Ireland
Buildings and structures in County Donegal